The following is a list of flags, banners and standards used in the United Arab Emirates

National flag

Presidential flag

Military flags

Emirate flags

Historical flags

Under Persian Rule

Under Arab Rule

Under Portuguese Rule

Under Omani Rule

Pirate Coast

Under British Rule

See also 

 Flag of the United Arab Emirates
 Emblem of the United Arab Emirates

References 

Lists and galleries of flags
Flags